Bree may refer to:

Places
 Bree, Belgium, a municipality
 Brée, a commune in the Mayenne department in France
 Bree, County Wexford, Ireland, a village
 Maasbree, Netherlands, a town formerly called Bree
 Breede River, also known as the Breë River, Western Cape Province, South Africa

People and fictional characters 
 Bree (name), a list of people and fictional characters with the given name, nickname or surname
 Bree Olson, stage name of American pornographic actress Rachel Oberlin (born 1986)

Other uses 
 Bree (Middle-earth), a fictional village in J. R. R. Tolkien's Middle-earth
 Bree BBC, a professional basketball team from Belgium

See also 
 Brie (disambiguation)
 Brianna (disambiguation)
 Breeing, a vocal technique